"Grace"  is an  episode from Season 7 of the science fiction television series Stargate SG-1. Amanda Tapping won a Leo Award in the category "Dramatic Series: Best Lead Performance - Female" for this episode.

Plot

The Prometheus is traveling back to Earth with a hyperdrive from an Al'kesh. Every couple of hours, the Prometheus has to drop out of hyperspace to cool down the Al'kesh hyperdrive. The Prometheus comes near a nebula that Samantha Carter thinks doesn't conform to nebulae she has previously studied. When they drop out of hyperspace, the Prometheus is attacked by an unknown vessel. They can't jump into hyperspace because the engines need to cool down. The Prometheus is chased into a gas cloud by the alien ship. Samantha Carter is knocked out when she tries to convert power from auxiliary to the hyperdrive to make a small hyperspace jump into the cloud. When she wakes up, all the crew members other than her have disappeared and Carter is suffering from a worsening concussion. She alone must get herself and them to safety. She has visions of a little girl running around the ship, playing with bubbles and of her friends, who vocalize her worries and theories about her predicament. Teal'c at one point grabs Carter by the arm and warns her that if she falls asleep she will die.

The hallucination of Daniel Jackson frankly confesses that he is unreal but he is present because there is something she has overlooked. The hallucination of Teal'c warns her that this whole scenario could be a result of the hostile alien species mind-probing, with a view to her inadvertently surrendering information about the Prometheus engine technology. Daniel then reappears and tells her that the 'nebula' may be a living being which is why she and the alien ship are stuck inside.

The hallucinations of Jacob Carter and of Jack O'Neill serve as a means by which Carter confronts her personal life and her relationships (in particular when talking to 'Jack', her feelings for him). 'Jack' tells her he will always be there for her, no matter what.

After an encounter with the small girl who is playing with bubbles Carter hits on a solution. She engages the hyperdrive with only a fraction of the usual amount of power. This has the effect of rendering the ship partially intangible.

She contacts the alien ship, also trapped inside of the cloud and offers them the solution to escaping the nebula in exchange for the return of the crew and safe passage. After a confused crew are beamed back in to the Prometheus, Carter creates a hyperspace bubble large enough to encompass both the Prometheus and the alien ship and they both exit the nebula safely. The aliens keep their end of the bargain and jet away. Carter relieves herself of duty and is escorted to the infirmary for treatment.

Reception

"Grace" was first broadcast on January 6, 2004 on Sky One in the United Kingdom. It was then shown for the first time in the United States on January 16, 2004 on Sci Fi, earning a Nielsen rating of 1.8. This was down on the channel's record breaking 2.2 household rating for the previous week's episode "Evolution", but remained above the season average of 1.7. In Canada the episode was first shown on December 2, 2004 on SPACE. The episode was first syndicated in the United States during the week of January 17, 2005 and achieved a 2.5 household rating, equating to approximately 2.7 million viewers which made it the most watched episode of season seven to-date.

Reviewing for SFX Jayne Dearsley awarded the episode five out of five stars, praising Tapping's "pitch-perfect performance". Dearsley believed the episode delivered "some genuine, creepy chills, a good dollop of emotion and some lovely effects" and called the use of hallucinations "refreshing", writing "Carter's visions could've been explained away as some sort of technobabble-heavy anomaly, but, happily, they're not supernatural at all; just side effects of the bang on her bonce". Reviewing for TV Zone Jan Vincent-Rudzki called it "Not a great episode, but well executed" and compared the premise to Star Trek, awarding the episode 7 out of 10. Reviewing for fansite Gateworld, Ali Snow awarded the episode three and a half stars, hailing Tapping for carrying the episode, calling her performance "brilliant". Snow also praised how Kindler appeared to flirt with Star Trek tropes such as "sentient space anomaly" and "alien mind trick" "then veers back into an original and satisfying story".

Amanda Tapping won a Leo Award in the category "Dramatic Series: Best Lead Performance - Female" for this episode. Sina Oroomchi, David Hibbert, Devan Kraushar and David Cur were nominated for a Leo Award in "Best Overall Sound in a Dramatic Series", losing to The Collector episode "The Rapper".

References

External links

 
 "Grace" at the official MGM Stargate site.
 "Grace" at scifi.com
 "Grace" screenplay (PDF)
 "Grace" at the fansite Gateworld.net

Stargate SG-1 episodes
2004 American television episodes